Stadionul Chimia is a multi-purpose stadium, frequently used for football. It is located in Brazi. The stadium holds 2,000 people.

Football venues in Romania
Buildings and structures in Prahova County
Multi-purpose stadiums in Romania